Lady Agnes Campbell (1526–1601) was the daughter of The 3rd Earl of Argyll and his wife, Lady Jean Gordon, daughter of The 3rd Earl of Huntly. She was likely born at Inveraray Castle. Her sister, Elizabeth, married The 1st Earl of Moray, an illegitimate son of King James IV of Scotland.

Campbell married James MacDonald, the 6th Chief of Clan MacDonald of Dunnyveg and the Glens of Antrim in 1545, forming an alliance with the MacDonalds. Women in early modern Scotland did not use their husband's surnames after marriage. They had six sons and one daughter, Finola O'Donnell, more famously known as Iníon Dubh. She married Sir Hugh O'Donnell.

In June 1563 Agnes Campbell gave Mary, Queen of Scots a "marvellous fair" Highland costume to wear on a progress to Argyll.

Campbell's husband James died in 1565 while he was being held prisoner by the Irish chieftain Shane O'Neill. At that time O'Neill had been supporting the English.

In 1569, she moved to Ireland to marry Turlough Lynagh O'Neill, who had replaced Shane O'Neill as the Chief of the Name of the Clan O'Neill of Tyrone. She took with her a dowry of 1,200 Highland troops, and Gaelic tradition allowed her to lead the troops. She personally led them against occupying English forces and proved herself a formidable leader. She also helped mobilise Scottish support for the Irish. Agnes Campbell was fluent in English and Latin, which greatly impressed the English.

In May 1580 she came to Scotland with her son Agnus O'Neill to visit her nephew, Colin Campbell, 6th Earl of Argyll, and the Scottish royal court to discuss issues over her Scottish property and her husband's affairs.

References

1526 births
1601 deaths
Agnes
16th-century Scottish people
16th-century Irish people
Women in 16th-century warfare
Women in European warfare
Daughters of Scottish earls
Clanconnell